Alice in Wondertown (original title in Spanish: Alicia en el pueblo de Maravillas) is a 1991 film directed by Daniel Díaz Torres. It was film of satire, absurdity and horror, seen as a criticism of the problems of Cuban society, which caused a significant controversy in the country. Cinema critic  Juan Antonio García Borrero has been planning to include it in a book under a tentative title Diez películas que estremecieron a Cuba (Ten Films That Shook Cuba)

Plot
Superficially, the film is framed as a murder mystery. While hitching a ride in  a back of a pickup truck full of workers, Alice is attacked by a strange cloaked person. She pushes him to fall overboard while the truck is crossing a high bridge, and she is accused of murder. However the body mysteriously disappears, she is relieved of murder charges, and she narrates her story, presented as a flashback in the film.  Her adventure starts when she is delegated to a small town of Maravillas ("Wondertown"; maravilla=wonder). While the title is an allusion to Alice in Wonderland, it is not an adaptation of the  English book.   There are a number of allusions and parallels, but they are difficult to recognize to people who did not live in Cuba at this time period. In fact, Juan Borrero mentioned that a young Cuban born the year the film was cast told him that he could not understand why the film caused such a controversy.

The major characters of the film, a school teacher, black market traders, lazy service providers, disgraced priest, etc., are exiled to this town for their violations, and are forced into a submission by a supernatural city mayor. Only after Alice matures and stops blindly believing in the authorities, she manages to return to her real world.

Reception

References

External links
 

1991 films
Cuban comedy films
1990s Spanish-language films
Political satire films